Ratu Epenisa Seru Cakobau (pronounced ) (born ~) is a Fijian chief.  Cakobau is a senior member of the Tui Kaba clan and a high chief on the island of Bau. He is the son of former Governor-General of Fiji and Vunivalu of Bau Ratu Sir George Cakobau, and a great-great grandson of Ratu Seru Epenisa Cakobau, the warlord who established the first unified Fijian Kingdom in 1871 and ceded it to the United Kingdom in 1874. 

Cakobau has been involved in politics; he was elected to the House of Representatives of Fiji in the 1999 Fijian general election as a candidate of the Soqosoqo ni Vakavulewa ni Taukei (SVT), representing the open constituency of Tailevu South Lomaiviti. When the Conservative Alliance, a nationalistic political party was founded in 2001, Cakobau was chosen as its first president. In 2007 when the military regime suspended the Great Council of Chiefs in the aftermath of the 2006 Fijian coup d'état, Cakobau was part of a legal challenge to the suspension. He later opposed the military regime's People's Charter for Change, Peace and Progress.

In 2018 he was arrested to prevent a ceremony to install him as the Vunivalu of Bau. In July 2019 he revealed that he had relocated his family overseas after receiving death threats over the title.

In July 2020 he was elected president of the Social Democratic Liberal Party. He remained with SODELPA when Sitiveni Rabuka split from the party. His term as president expired in 2022, and he was replaced by Manoa Roragaca.

In March 2023 he was installed as Vunivalu of Bau.

Personal life
He married Adi Frances Loloma in September 1986.

References

Fijian chiefs
Living people
Year of birth missing (living people)
I-Taukei Fijian members of the House of Representatives (Fiji)
Conservative Alliance-Matanitu Vanua politicians
Soqosoqo ni Vakavulewa ni Taukei politicians
Politicians from Bau (island)